Madhuca pubicalyx is a tree in the family Sapotaceae. The specific epithet pubicalyx means "soft-haired calyx".

Description
The bark is greyish brown. Inflorescences bear up to eight flowers.

Distribution and habitat
Madhuca pubicalyx is endemic to Borneo. Its habitat is mixed dipterocarp forest to  altitude.

Conservation
Madhuca pubicalyx has been assessed as near threatened on the IUCN Red List. The species is threatened by logging and conversion of land for palm oil plantations.

References

pubicalyx
Endemic flora of Borneo
Trees of Borneo
Plants described in 1934